Ralph Cole may refer to:

 Ralph Cole (chancellor), English medieval Chancellor of Oxford University
 Ralph Cole (Ohio representative) (1914–1999), member of the Ohio House of Representatives
 Ralph D. Cole (1873–1932), U.S. Representative from Ohio
 Sir Ralph Cole, 2nd Baronet (1629–1704), English politician.

See also
Cole (name)